This is a list of cultural heritage monuments in :Rwanda.

List of monuments in Kigali City
 Kigali Genocide Memorial
 Kandt House Museum
 Rwanda Art Museum
 St. Michael cathedral
 Sainte-Famille Church
 Anti-corruption Monument
 Belgian Peacekeepers Memorial
 Regina Pacis Catholic Church
 Rwanda Art Museum
 Niyo Arts Gallery
 Amahoro National Stadium
 Nyamata Genocide Memorial
 Intare Conference Arena
 Gikondo Prison
 Gisimba Memorial Centre
 King Faisal Hospital Kigali
 Museum for Campaign Against Genocide

List of monuments in Southern Province 
 King's Palace Museum
 National Art Gallery
 Mwima Mausoleum
 King Christ Catholic Church
 Huye Ethnographic Museum
 Mutara III Rudahigwa 's Palace
 Our Lady of Wisdom Cathedral, Butare
 Cathedral Basilica of Our Lady

List of monuments in Western Province 
 Urutare rwa Ndaba 
 Jesus's House of Mercy in Ruhango (Mu rugo rwa Yezu Nyirimpuhwe)
 Our Lady of Kibeho Shrine
 Byumba cathedral
 Butare Catholic cathedral
 Bisesero Genocide Memorial Centre

List of monuments in Eastern Province 

 Utubindi twa Rubona  (The Pots of Rubona )
 Urutare Rwa Ngarama (Ngarama rock)
 Ku kirenge cya Ruganzu (Ruganzu's footprints)
 Ntarama Genocide Memorial Centre 
 Nyamata Genocide Memorial Centre

List of monuments in Northern Province 

 Ku kirenge cya Ruganzu

References 

 https://www.visitrwanda.com/interests/museums-and-art-galleries/
 https://www.inspirock.com/cultural-activities-in-rwanda
 https://www.newtimes.co.rw/section/read/190538
 https://www.visitrwandaguide.com/rwanda-safari/rwanda-cultural-attractions/
 http://www.cyangugu.anglican.org/

Monuments and memorials in Africa by country
Rwanda
Monuments